Taoshan District is a district and the seat of the city of Qitaihe, Heilongjiang province, China.

Administrative divisions 
Taoshan District is divided into 15 subdistricts and 1 town. 
15 subdistricts
 Xianghe Shequgonggongfuwuzhan, Yunguan Shequgonggongfuwuzhan, Ankang Shequgonggongfuwuzhan, * Wenyuan Shequgonggongfuwuzhan, Zhaoyang Shequgonggongfuwuzhan, Dongzheng Shequgonggongfuwuzhan, Xuri Shequgonggongfuwuzhan, Huayuan Shequgonggongfuwuzhan, Yinquan Shequgonggongfuwuzhan, Yunxiao Shequgonggongfuwuzhan, Tongren Shequgonggongfuwuzhan, Dongfang Shequgonggongfuwuzhan, Xuefu Shequgonggongfuwuzhan, Taoshan Shequgonggongfuwuzhan  and Changqing Shequgonggongfuwuzhan()
1 towns
 Wanbaohe

References

Taoshan